The following lists events of the year 2023 in Vanuatu.

Incumbents 

 President: Nikenike Vurobaravu
 Prime Minister: Ishmael Kalsakau

Events 

 5 January – Sato Kilman orders an investigation into the Vanuatu People's Investment and Equity Fund after failing to deliver on promised financial returns.
 8 January – A 7.0 magnitude earthquake strikes offshore near Sanma, Vanuatu.
 1 February – The East Epi submarine volcano erupts in Epi, Vanuatu, for the first time since 2004, sending ash 300 feet into the air, with a 10 kilometer radius danger zone.

References 

 
2020s in Vanuatu
Years of the 21st century in Vanuatu
Vanuatu
Vanuatu